Yuri Nikolayevich Shishlov (23 January 1945 – 5 August 2010) was a Russian professional football coach and player.

Shishlov was shot in Moscow on 4 August 2010 and he died in hospital on 5 August. Police believe that Shishlov's murder was a contract killing related to a court case in which he testified against his former boss Vladimir Shepel at FC Shinnik Yaroslavl.

References

External links
 Career summary at KLISF

Soviet footballers
FC Rotor Volgograd players
FC SKA Rostov-on-Don players
FC Elista players
Soviet football managers
Russian football managers
FC Elista managers
Russian Premier League managers
FC Metallurg Lipetsk managers
1945 births
2010 deaths
Deaths by firearm in Russia
Male murder victims
People murdered in Russia
Russian murder victims
Association football defenders